There have been two baronetcies created for persons with the surname Gibbons, one in the Baronetage of Great Britain and one in the Baronetage of the United Kingdom. One creation is extant as of 2012.

The Gibbons Baronetcy, of Stanwell Place in the County of Middlesex, was created in the Baronetage of Great Britain on 21 April 1752 for Sir William Gibbons, Speaker of the House of Assembly, Barbados. The second Baronet sat as Member of Parliament for Stockbridge and Wallingford. The fifth Baronet was high sheriff of Middlesex in 1891. Two other members of the family may also be mentioned. Frederick Kenrick Colquhoun Gibbons (1865–1954), son of Captain Frederick Gibbons, brother of the fifth Baronet, was a captain in the Royal Navy. Sir William Kenrick Gibbons (1876–1957), son of Sir William Gibbons, grandson of Robert Gibbons, fourth son of the second Baronet, was Clerk of the House of Commons.

The Gibbons Baronetcy, of Sittingbourne in the County of Kent, was created in the Baronetage of the United Kingdom on 22 March 1872 for Sills Gibbons, Lord Mayor of London from 1871 to 1872. The title became extinct on his death in 1876.

Gibbons baronets, of Stanwell Place (1752)

Sir William Gibbons, 1st Baronet (died 1760)
Sir John Gibbons, 2nd Baronet (–1776)
Sir William Gibbons, 3rd Baronet (1749–1814)
Sir John Gibbons, 4th Baronet (1774–1844)
Sir John Gibbons, 5th Baronet (1825–1893)
Sir Charles Gibbons, 6th Baronet (1828–1909)
Sir Alexander Doran Gibbons, 7th Baronet (1873–1956)
Sir John Edward Gibbons, 8th Baronet (1914–1982)
Sir William Edward Doran Gibbons, 9th Baronet (born 1948)

Gibbons baronets, of Sittingbourne (1872)
Sir Sills John Gibbons, 1st Baronet (1809–1876)

References

External links
www.burkespeerage.com
Kidd, Charles, Williamson, David (editors). Debrett's Peerage and Baronetage (1990 edition). New York: St Martin's Press, 1990.

Baronetcies in the Baronetage of Great Britain
Extinct baronetcies in the Baronetage of the United Kingdom
1752 establishments in Great Britain
1872 establishments in the United Kingdom